Uttaranallur Nangai (Tamil: உத்தரநல்லூர் நங்கை) was a female Tamil Paraiyar poet who lived in the 15th century CE. She is best known for her strong views against the caste and gender hierarchies of her time. As a Dalit herself, she passionately expresses these views in her only surviving work, the Paichalur Padigam.

Biography 
Her name, Uttaranallur Nangai, is a combination of Uttaranallur (her birthplace) and Nangai (meaning maiden). Being a Dalit and a woman, she was forbidden from studying the Vedas during her time. In spite of that, she studies the Vedas from a Brahmin boy in secret. Eventually, she falls in love with that Brahmin boy and marries him as well.

For her dual transgression of reading the forbidden sacred texts and breaking caste taboos, she was sentenced to death by being burned alive by the elders of the Paichalur village. When the elders came to the Paraiya street to carry out the sentence, she composed the work Paichalur Padigam addressing them. A verse from that work is quoted below:

¹ Pulaya refers to a Dalit caste

See also 
Bhakti movement 
Tamil literature
Caste system

References 

15th-century Indian writers
Tamil poets
Indian women poets
15th-century Indian women writers